Rajko Rotman (born 19 March 1989) is a Slovenian professional footballer who plays for Tuzlaspor as a midfielder.

Career statistics

References

External links
NZS profile 

1989 births
Living people
Sportspeople from Maribor
Slovenian footballers
Association football midfielders
Slovenia international footballers
Slovenian Second League players
Slovenian PrvaLiga players
Süper Lig players
TFF First League players
NK Aluminij players
NK Rudar Velenje players
İstanbul Başakşehir F.K. players
Kayserispor footballers
Göztepe S.K. footballers
Akhisarspor footballers
Tuzlaspor players
Slovenian expatriate footballers
Slovenian expatriate sportspeople in Turkey
Expatriate footballers in Turkey